CLPS may refer to:

 Center Line Public Schools, a public school district in Center Line, Michigan
 Central Lake Public Schools, a public school district in Central Lake, Michigan
 Department of Cognitive, Linguistic, and Psychological Sciences, an academic department at Brown University
 Colipase, a protein co-enzyme secreted by the pancreas
 Commercial Lunar Payload Services, a NASA project to send small payloads to the Moon
 Constituency Labour Party, a local branch of the British Labour Party